Abigail was the wife of King David.

Abigail may also refer to:

People
 Abigail (name), a feminine given name and a surname
 Abigail (actress) (born 1946), born Abigail Rogan, English Australian actress

Media
Abigail (novel), a 1979 novel by Magda Szabó
Abigail (album), a 1987 King Diamond album
"Abigail", a song by Motionless in White
Abigail (TV series) (1988–1989), a Venezuelan telenovela
Abigail (2019 feature film), a Russian fantasy adventure film
Abigail (2019 short film), an American short drama film

Other
Cyclone Abigail, various tropical cyclones
HMS Abigail, various Royal Navy ships

See also
Avigayil, an Israeli settlement
Abgal (disambiguation)